The  Philadelphia Eagles season was the franchise's 69th season in the National Football League, and the third under head coach Andy Reid. the team made the postseason for the second consecutive time. After defeating the Tampa Bay Buccaneers in the wildcard round for the second year in a row, and the Chicago Bears in the divisional round, the Eagles advanced to the NFC Championship for the first time in 21 years, but lost 29–24 to the St. Louis Rams. The Rams advanced to the Super Bowl, but were unable to stop the New England Patriots, losing 20–17.

This was the first of four consecutive NFC East titles for the Eagles. It was also the first of five Conference Championship game appearances for the Eagles with Donovan McNabb as starting quarterback and Andy Reid as head coach.

Offseason

Draft

Staff

Roster

Regular season

Schedule

Note: Intra-division opponents are in bold text.

Game summaries

Week 6 
The Eagles were able to break a nine-game losing streak against the Giants by winning this game. James Thrash caught the winning TD from Donovan McNabb in the fourth quarter.

Standings

Playoffs

Wild Card

NFC: Philadelphia Eagles 31, Tampa Bay Buccaneers 9

Eagles quarterback Donovan McNabb threw for 194 yards and two touchdowns, while also rushing for 54 yards, as Philadelphia dominated Tampa Bay from start to finish. Bucs quarterback Brad Johnson was intercepted four times, twice by Damon Moore. It was the second consecutive season in which Philadelphia eliminated Tampa Bay from the playoffs during the wild card round, and two days later, Buccaneers coach Tony Dungy was fired.

On the Eagles first drive of the game, Buccaneers safety Dexter Jackson intercepted a pass from McNabb and returned it nine yards to the Eagles 36-yard line, setting up a 36-yard field goal from Martín Gramática. But McNabb made up for his mistake with a 39-yard run on third down and 5 on Philadelphia's ensuing possession

Divisional round

NFC: Philadelphia Eagles 33, Chicago Bears 19

The Bears surprised everyone by finishing atop the NFC Central with a 13–3 record behind quarterback Jim Miller. But after the Eagles jumped to a 6–0 lead, Miller was taken out of the game in the second quarter with a separated shoulder. Although Miller's replacement, Shane Matthews, led the Bears to a touchdown (a 47-yard reverse by Ahmad Merritt), and Jerry Azumah's 39-yard interception return briefly put the Bears back in the lead early in the second half, the Eagles controlled most of the rest of the game. Matthews threw for only 66 yards and was intercepted twice. Meanwhile, Eagles quarterback Donovan McNabb threw for 262 yards and two touchdowns, and ran for another touchdown.

The Eagles controlled the first quarter, scoring with two field goals by David Akers while holding the Bears to 25 offensive

NFC Championship

NFC: St. Louis Rams 29, Philadelphia Eagles 24

The Eagles had a 17–13 lead at halftime, and had not allowed more than 21 points per game during the season and playoffs. But the Rams roared back thanks to Kurt Warner completing two-thirds of his passes for 212 yards and Marshall Faulk's 159 yards rushing and two touchdowns to earn their second trip to the Super Bowl in three years.

Early in the first quarter, Donovan McNabb fumbled while being sacked by defensive end Leonard Little, and Brian Young recovered for the Rams at the Philadelphia 20-yard line. Five plays later, Warner threw a 5-yard touchdown pass to Isaac Bruce. Philadelphia responded with an 11-play, 50-yard drive, featuring a 20-yard run by Duce Staley, that ended with a 46-yard field goal by David Akers. Rams receiver Yo Murphy returned the ensuing kickoff 43 yards to his team's own 42-yard line before Warner completed a 20-yard pass

Awards and honors

References

External links 
 2001 Philadelphia Eagles at Pro-Football-Reference.com

Philadelphia Eagles seasons
Philadelphia Eagles
NFC East championship seasons
Philadelphia Eagles